John Radcliffe may refer to:

John Radcliffe (died 1441), Member of Parliament for Norfolk
John Radcliffe (died 1568) (1539–1568), MP for Grampound and Castle Rising
John Q. Radcliffe (1920–2001), Wisconsin State Assemblyman
 John Radcliffe (1738-1783) (1738–1783), British politician who sat in the House of Commons from 1768 to 1783

Others
John Radcliffe (physician) (1652–1714), British physician
John Radcliffe Hospital, Oxford, named after the above
John Netten Radcliffe (1826–1884), English epidemiologist
John Radcliff (1848–1911), American baseball player

See also
 John Radclive, Canadian hangman
John Ratcliffe (disambiguation)